The Admiral William F. Halsey Health and Public Safety Academy  is a four-year comprehensive public high school in Elizabeth, in Union County, New Jersey, United States, operating as part of the Elizabeth Public Schools. The Leadership Academy shares a large building with the John Dwyer Technology Academy, the Peter B. Gold Administration Building, and the Thomas Dunn Sports Center, which together form the Main Complex. The school has been accredited by the Middle States Association of Colleges and Schools Commission on Elementary and Secondary Schools since 2013.

As of the 2021–22 school year, the school had an enrollment of 1,331 students and 81.0 classroom teachers (on an FTE basis), for a student–teacher ratio of 16.4:1. There were 715 students (53.7% of enrollment) eligible for free lunch and 89 (6.7% of students) eligible for reduced-cost lunch.

Awards, recognition and rankings
The school was the 335th-ranked public high school in New Jersey out of 339 schools statewide in New Jersey Monthly magazine's September 2014 cover story on the state's "Top Public High Schools", using a new ranking methodology. The school had been ranked 311th in the state of 328 schools in 2012, after not being ranked in 2010.

History
The High school was established in 2009 as the Admiral William F. Halsey Leadership Academy and was named after Admiral William Halsey Jr., Commander of the South Pacific Area and the Third Fleet during World War II, who was born in Elizabeth.  During the war, he commented, "There are no great men. There are only great challenges that ordinary men like you and me are forced by circumstances to meet."

In 2016, the Academy of Finance branched off into its own School at the former location of Upper Academy. The School was later renamed into the Admiral William F. Halsey Health and Public Safety.

Curriculum
Students enrolled in the Admiral William F. Halsey Jr. Leadership Academy, in addition to completing a college preparatory program, also participate in programs, electives, classes, and activities that focus on the leadership development of each student. The principles of Stephen R. Covey's The Seven Habits of Highly Effective People serve as the foundation for the Halsey Leadership Academy program; peer leadership, community service, and student government activities are emphasized. Honors and advanced-placement classes are offered. School uniforms are mandated.

Each student has the opportunity to select from among the four "strands" of study offered. Students enrolling in the Military Leadership Strand participate in the school's Marine Corps Junior Reserve Officers' Training Corps. The school is one of five in the state to participate in the Marine Corps JROTC program.

Students enrolling in the Criminal Justice and Law Leadership Strand participate in  activities that provide them with an understanding of the responsibilities assumed by men and women who select careers in law enforcement or within the legal system.

Those enrolling in the Education Leadership Strand gain insight into what it takes to succeed in the education and childcare fields. Also, before 2016, students enrolling in the Business Leadership Strand. which was once part of the academy, participate in coursework, internships, and other activities that introduce them to the world of business and e-commerce, and help them to develop a foundation in entrepreneurial, management, and administrative skills. Those students who follow on those skills were later moved to their own School, known as the Academy of Finance, in Upper Academy.

Some extracurricular activities and sports teams are found in Halsey Academy. The building functions as a hub as other students from the other Elizabeth Academies and Elizabeth High School use the facility after school hours. The Main Complex also holds Elizabeth High School's swimming pool, where the swim team practices and meets are held.

References

External links
 Halsey Leadership Academy Site
 

2009 establishments in New Jersey
Education in Elizabeth, New Jersey
Educational institutions established in 2009
Public high schools in Union County, New Jersey